Oro, Plata, Mata is a 1982 Philippine historical war drama film directed by Peque Gallaga, from a story by Peque Gallaga, Mario Taguiwalo, and Conchita Castillo and screenplay by José Javier Reyes. The film is considered to be Gallaga's most significant contribution to the Philippine cinema. Set in the Philippine island of Negros during World War II, it tells the story of how two hacendero families cope with the changes brought about by the war. In translation, the movie is also known either as "Gold, Silver, Bad Luck" or "Gold, Silver, Death."

The title refers to the traditional Spanish Filipino architectural superstition saying that design elements in a house (particularly staircases) should not end in a multiple of three, in keeping with a pattern of oro (gold), plata (silver), and mata (bad luck).  The film is structured in three parts that depict this pattern played out in the lives of the main characters, from a life of luxury and comfort in the city ("oro/gold"), to a still-luxurious time of refuge in a provincial hacienda ("plata/silver"), and finally to a retreat deeper into the mountains, where they are victimized by guerilla bandits ("mata/bad luck").

It was filmed on location in the whole province of Negros Occidental, primarily in Bacolod and the Mt. Kanlaon National Park. The staff and crew have received extensive assistance and support from the Ministry of National Defense, Ministry of Tourism, and the Armed Forces of the Philippines. The film's musical score was provided by Jose Gentica V; the film's photography was handled by Rody Lacap, and the editing was handled by Jesus Navarro. The film's development was financially supported and acknowledged by the Philippine National Bank.

In 2013, ABS-CBN Film Archives in partnership with Central Digital Lab digitally restored and remastered the film and was subsequently released in select theaters for a limited period of time. The digitally restored version was also released on DVD and iTunes.

Opening quote 

According to the audio commentary by Peque Gallaga, he told the film's screenwriter, Jose Javier Reyes, to create a frame reference for the film and the latter answered to cite a quote from Nick Joaquin. Peque agreed with the decision and he revealed that he enjoyed reading his works.

Plot 
Oro, Plata, Mata traces the changing fortunes of two hacendero or sugar-estate-owning families on the island of Negros during World War II. The Ojeda family is celebrating Maggie Ojeda's (Andolong) debut. In the garden, Trining (Gil) receives her first kiss from Miguel Lorenzo (Torre), her childhood sweetheart. Don Claudio Ojeda (Ojeda) and his fellow landowners talk about the impending war and some of the young able-bodied men decided to enlist for the war. The celebration was cut short by news of the sinking of SS Corregidor by a mine. As the Japanese invasion force nears the city, the Ojeda family accepts the invitation extended by the Lorenzos, their old family friends, to stay with them in their provincial hacienda. Nena Ojeda (Lorena) and Inday Lorenzo (Asensio) try to deny the realities of war by preserving their pre-war lifestyle. Pining for her fiancé, Maggie goes through bouts of melancholy. Miguel and Trining turn from naughty children into impetuous adults.

Two more family friends, Jo Russell (Valdez) and Viring (Villanueva) join them in the refuge. As they witness the burning of the city and the enemy in advance, the families evacuate to the Lorenzo family's forest lodge. A group of weary guerrillas arrive and Jo tends to their injuries. The guerrillas leave Hermes Mercurio (Lazaro) behind. Miguel endures more comments of the same kind when he fails to take action against a Japanese soldier who came upon the girls bathing in the river. It is Mercurio who kills the Japanese. Maggie comforts Miguel, who decides to learn how to shoot from Mercurio. Later, Viring's jewelry is stolen by Melchor (de la Cruz), the trusted foreman. He justifies his action as a reward for his services. He tries to break the other servants' loyalty by telling them to join him, but they did not force Melchor to leave. Later, Melchor and his band of thieves return and take revenge on them. They raid the food supplies, rape Inday, and chop off Viring's fingers when she does not take off her ring. Trining unexpectedly goes with the bandits despite all the crimes they had committed against her family. These experiences committed Maggie and Miguel closer together. Miguel urges the survivors to resume their mahjong games to help them cope with their trauma. Miguel is determined to hunt the bandits down and bring Trining back. He catches them in an abandoned hospital, but his courage is replaced with bloodlust, driving him to a killing spree. An epilogue follows the violent climax where Miguel and Mercurio finally killed Melchor and their remaining men.

At last, in 1945, the Americans have liberated the Philippines from Japan. A party is held in the Ojeda home to announce Maggie and Miguel's betrothal. The survivors attempt to reclaim their previous lifestyle, but the war has changed the world, just as it has forever changed each of them.

Cast

Release
Oro, Plata, Mata is the first film produced by the Experimental Cinema of the Philippines as pursuant to Executive Order No. 770 by President Ferdinand E. Marcos. The film was first released on January 27, 1982, and it was approved to be shown by the Board of Censors for Motion Pictures. It was also shown in the United States on October 1, 1983, as part of the Chicago International Film Festival and in Japan on November 1, 1991, as part of the Filipino Movies Festival, which was sponsored and presented by the ASEAN Cultural Center.

Digital restoration
In the late 1990s, ABS-CBN originally planned to restore Oro, Plata, Mata but the costs for the analog restoration were expensive, exceeding up to 20 million pesos. According to Leo P. Katigbak, the head of ABS-CBN Film Archives, they didn't proceed with the analog restoration of the film by fixing the film prints without addressing the defects in every frame. Eventually, the film was digitally restored and remastered in 2012 by the ABS-CBN Film Restoration and Central Digital Lab (supervised by Manet T. Dayrit and Rick Hawthorne). Peque Gallaga (the film's director) and Rody Lacap (the film's cinematographer) were involved in the restoration process. It is the second film to be restored by the ABS-CBN Film Restoration and Central Digital Lab.

Before the restoration was commenced, the film print of the ABS-CBN Film Archives and two reserve prints were considered as the source of elements for the restoration but the ABS-CBN archive print was chosen instead because of the film's picture quality was better. Peque Gallaga was consulted in preserving the original colours of the film since the film print was already fading. Central Digital Lab took 1,871 manual hours to complete the film restoration and 80 hours for color grading. The film's audio was restored by Post Haste Sound Inc. in Los Angeles, California, United States. It was lifted from the Betacam tape and upgraded from mono audio to Dolby Digital 5.1 audio mix.

Reception

Critical reception 
Film critic Noel Vera praised the whole film's narrative of the Second World War as "beautifully structured" with a reference of the architectural superstition to the film; the bright conception and development of the characters; and the whole screenplay being similar to the 1939 epic historical drama film Gone with the Wind, starring Clark Gable and Vivien Leigh. However, Peque Gallaga didn't even reach the highs from Luchino Visconti's 1963 film The Leopard because there are no found references and symbolisms developed from the Italian film. As a result, the film is considered a "masterpiece", also praising its cinematography, screenplay, and production designs.

Accolades
The movie won the 1982 Gawad Urian awards for Best Picture, Direction, Cinematography, Production Design, Musical Score, and Sound. In the same year, it won the Luna Awards for Production Design and Best Supporting Actress (Liza Lorena). It is marketed as one of the top ten best films of the 1980s.

Notes

References

External links 

1982 films
Philippine drama films
1980s Tagalog-language films
Films directed by Peque Gallaga
World War II films
Japanese occupation of the Philippines films
Star Cinema films